Serrodes flavitincta is a moth of the family Erebidae. It is found in South Africa.

References

Endemic moths of South Africa
Moths described in 1926
Serrodes